Johannes Eberly House, also known as the Old Bricker House or the McCormick House, is a historic home located at Hampden Township in Cumberland County, Pennsylvania. It was built between 1794 and 1798, and is a -story, fieldstone building with a gable roof, four bays wide. Its architecture suggests a transition from Georgian to Federal style, with a combination of Dutch-German and English building styles.  Its builder, Martin Rupp, also built Peace Church.

It was listed on the National Register of Historic Places in 1973.

The Johannes Eberly House is also notable for being the site of the Skirmish of Sporting Hill, the northernmost engagement of Robert E. Lee's Army of Northern Virginia during the American Civil War.

References 

Houses on the National Register of Historic Places in Pennsylvania
Georgian architecture in Pennsylvania
Federal architecture in Pennsylvania
Houses completed in 1798
Houses in Cumberland County, Pennsylvania
National Register of Historic Places in Cumberland County, Pennsylvania